"Do You Want To" is the lead single from Scottish rock band Franz Ferdinand's second studio album, You Could Have It So Much Better (2005). It was released 19 September 2005 and charted at number four on the UK Singles Chart. In the US, the song had the most success on the Modern Rock chart, where it peaked at number nine, while reaching number 76 on the Billboard Hot 100. It also reached the top spot on the UK Indie Chart. In February 2006, the single was certified Gold by the Recording Industry Association of America.

The video, directed by Diane Martel, was released on 23 August and was played every hour on MTV2 on the day it debuted.

Reception
"Do You Want To" was named the Sound Opinions single of 2005. The song also came 10th in Triple J's Hottest 100 for 2005. On Qs "Top 100 Indie Anthems Ever", it was placed on number 43; Q also named it the greatest single of 2005. Pitchfork Media ranked the song at number 342 in their list of the "Top 500 Tracks of the 2000s".

Track listings
UK CD single 
 "Do You Want To"
 "Fabulously Lazy"
 "What You Meant" (acoustic)

UK 7-inch single 
A. "Do You Want To"
B. "Get Away"

UK 12-inch single 
A. "Do You Want To" (Erol Alkan's Glam Racket)
AA. "Do You Want To" (original version)

European CD single 
 "Do You Want To"
 "Your Diary"

Charts

Weekly charts

Year-end charts

Certifications

Release history

Usage in the media
The song has appeared in many commercials and trailers, such as Fun With Dick and Jane, Daddy Day Camp, Good Luck Chuck, DualDisc Intro, and New Girl. The song was featured as the ending theme song to the anime series Paradise Kiss, as well as being used on children's TV channel, CBeebies. The song was also used for Dance Dance Revolution SuperNOVA, and is now available as downloadable content for the video game Rock Band. Also appear on the Soundtracks of
Top Spin 3. It was also played in the beginning of the CSI: NY episode "Bad Beat". This song was featured in Steve Aoki's, "Pillowface and His Airplane Chronicles."

References

2005 singles
Anime songs
Franz Ferdinand (band) songs
Music videos directed by Diane Martel
Song recordings produced by Rich Costey
Songs written by Alex Kapranos
Songs written by Bob Hardy (bassist)
Songs written by Nick McCarthy
Songs written by Paul Thomson
UK Independent Singles Chart number-one singles
Paradise Kiss
Domino Recording Company singles